Cucina (Italian "cuisine" or "kitchen") or La cucina may refer to:

 La Cucina (film)
 La Cucina (band)
 La Cucina (opera) 2019